Twelve Oaks, or the J.W. Bass House, is a historic farm estate at 7210 Arkansas Highway 7 South in rural Boone County, Arkansas, south of Harrison.  The main house is a dramatic and architecturally eclectic two-story building with a variety of Craftsman, Colonial Revival, and Mission style details.  It is a stucco-finished concrete construction, whose roof has exposed rafter tails, and was originally finished in tile, replaced after a 1973 tornado extensively damaged the property.  At the time of its construction in 1922 (at a cost of $250,000), it was one of the finest plantation houses in the state.  It was built by J. W. Bass, a businessman responsible for the construction of a number of Harrison's finest buildings, who developed a  farm south of the city, with this property as its centerpiece.  It was named "Twelve Oaks" after a grove of twelve large oak trees, none of which survived the 1973 tornado.

The house was listed on the National Register of Historic Places in 2010.

See also
National Register of Historic Places listings in Boone County, Arkansas

References

Houses on the National Register of Historic Places in Arkansas
Colonial Revival architecture in Arkansas
Houses completed in 1922
Houses in Boone County, Arkansas
National Register of Historic Places in Boone County, Arkansas
1922 establishments in Arkansas